Michael John Back (born 26 June 1957) is an Australian lawyer. He is a senior partner of Herbert Smith Freehills and head of their Brisbane, Queensland office. He is an environmental and planning law specialist.

Early life and education
Back was born 26 June 1957 in Newcastle, New South Wales. He attended Newcastle Boys High School, completing the Higher School Certificate in 1975. He matriculated to the University of Sydney where he was graduated a Bachelor of Arts with Honours and a Bachelor of Laws with Honours.

Career
Back is currently a senior partner and head of the Brisbane office of Freehills. He specialises in environmental and planning law advising on major property developments and infrastructure projects. His particular area of expertise relates to the environmental and planning approval of projects, environmental audits and the preparation of environmental compliance and management programs.

Back was admitted as a solicitor in New South Wales on 5 November 1982 and was employed by Freehill, Hollingdale and Page, Martin Place, Sydney.

In 1989, he was admitted in Queensland as a Principal Solicitor with Freehills, Brisbane.

On the 12 July 2000, his name was added to the Roll of Practitioners in Western Australia.

He has lectured in Environmental Law at the University of Queensland.

Back has acted as the Honorary Solicitor for the PA Foundation, Princess Alexandra Hospital, Brisbane.

Back is an associate of the Australian Institute of Valuers and Land Economists, a member of the Property Council of Australia, Queensland Environmental Law Association (QELA) and of the Tourism and Travel Subcommittee of the Law Council of Australia.

In 2007 he was named as one of seven members of Queensland's Urban Land Development Authority to "fast track the Queensland Government’s delivery of new land for housing development."

Personal life
He married in 1983 and has four children.

References

External links
 Freehills Profile: Michael Back

People from Newcastle, New South Wales
People educated at Newcastle Boys' High School
Australian solicitors
1957 births
Living people
Academic staff of the University of Queensland
Sydney Law School alumni